Hans Rudolph Bachmann, Jr. (born June 24, 1954) is an American theatre and film actor, director, singer and editor of Swiss-German descent. He is best known for his lead roles as Harold Brickman in Beyond the Rising Moon and as Frank McCall in Invader.

Early life and education

Hans Rudolph Bachmann Jr. was born in Cleveland, Ohio on June 24, 1954 as the first of two children to Hans Rudolph Bachmann Sr. and Eulalia (Selig) Bachmann. His early years were spent growing up with his younger sister Eleanor Susan (Bachmann) Matthews in multiple locations in Ohio and elsewhere in the United States until his family settled down in Galion, Ohio when he was 10 years old. His parents emigrated to the United States from Switzerland and Germany after the Second World War.

Bachmann graduated from Galion High School in 1972. He played the trumpet in High School and was a member of the marching band as well as first chair in the High School orchestra. He went to college at Ohio State University in Columbus, Ohio where he received his Bachelor of Arts degree in English Theater in 1975. His studies included English as a major and Speech and Theater as minor subjects. Bachmann went on to study Law at Ohio Northern University in Ada, Ohio between 1976 and 1981, receiving a Juris Doctor Degree upon completion.

Career 

Bachmann's movie acting career spanned over three decades. He   spent the majority of his acting career on the theatre stage focussing predominantly on musicals.

One of his first roles was in the play 1776 which was performed at the Ohio State University, Mansfield Branch Campus in 1976. Bachmann played South Carolina's Edward Rutledge. Performances in subsequent years include Captain von Trapp in The Sound of Music, Adam Pontipee in Seven Brides for Seven Brothers and Emile De Becque in South Pacific.

Bachmann also directed various stage productions including Seven Brides for Seven Brothers, The Pajama Game, My Fair Lady, Hello Dolly!, A Christmas Carol, Witness for the Prosecution, Grease, Jesus Christ Superstar and Evita. The production of Meet Me in St. Louis with the Rockville Musical Theatre achieved the second runner-up award in the 1999 Ruby Griffith Awards for Outstanding Achievement in a Musical.

Filmography 

 1975 The Grotze - Farmer
 1987 Broadcast News - Man at Speech
 1987 Beyond the Rising Moon - Harold Brickman
 1992 Invader - Frank McCall
 2001 Great Books: Upton Sinclair's the Jungle (TV Movie)-  Socialist Organizer
 2002 Great Books: Exodus (TV Movie) - Father

Writer 

Bachmann was a writer of the 1985 film Morgengrauen

Theater performances 

American Century Theater, Arlington, Virginia
 Hollywood Pinafore - Mike Cochoran

Arena Stage, Washington, D.C.
 Screenplay - Comr Lister

Backstreet Theatre,  Upper Sandusky, Ohio
 Barefoot in the Park - Paul Bratter
 Seesaw - Jerry Ryan
The Music Man - Professor Harold Hill

C.A.S.T. in McLean,  McLean, Virginia
 Bye Bye Birdie - Albert J Peterson
Dial 'M' for Murder - Tony Wendice
The Sound of Music - | Captain von Trapp

Encore Theater,  Lima, Ohio
 The Pajama Game -  Sid Sorokin

Fairstage Theatre
1776 - Thomas Jefferson
Godspell - Jesus

Fay Jacobs Productions, Rehoboth Beach, DE
 USO Stage Door Canteen
 Man One

Folger Theatre, Washington, D.C.
 The Diary of a Scoundrel - Egor Kurchaev

Footlight Dinner Theater
 The Fantasticks -  Matt
 Ford's Theatre
 Washington, D.C.
 A Christmas Carol
 Nephew Fred

Fredericksburg Summer Theatre,  Fredericksburg, Virginia
 1776 -  Edward Rutledge
 Annie Get Your Gun -  Frank Butler
 Bus Stop -  Bo Decker
 Guys and Dolls -  Sky Masterson
 Our Town -  Simon Stimpson

Georgetown Summer Theater, Washington, D.C.
 Grease - Teen Angel/Johnny Casino

John F. Kennedy Center for the Performing Arts,  Washington, D.C.
 Goldfish -  Adolph Zucker

King's Jester Dinner Theater
 The Robber Bridegroom - * Preacher

Lazy Susan Dinner Theater,  Woodbridge, Virginia
 1776 -  Edward Rutledge
 Camelot -  King Arthur
 Clue the Musical -  Professor Plum
 Do Black Patent Leather Shoes Really Reflect Up? -  Father O’Reilley
 Guys and Dolls -  Sky Masterson
 I Do! I Do! -  Michael Snow
 Little Shop of Horrors -  Skip Snip/M Luce
 Seven Brides for Seven Brothers - * Adam Ponitpee
 Show Boat -  Gaylord Ravenal
 Something's Afoot -  Nigel Rancoor
 Ten Little Indians -  Judge Wargrave
 The Hollow -  Sir Henry Angkatell
 The Murder at the Vicarage -  Lawrence Redding
 The Pajama Game -  Sid Sorokin
 The Sound of Music -  Captain von Trapp

USO Stage Door Canteen -  Man One
 Witness for the Prosecution -  Sir Wilfred Robarts

Little Theatre of Alexandria,  Alexandria, Virginia
 Baby -  Nick Sakarian
 Mack and Mabel -  Mack Sennett
 Something's Afoot -  Nigel Rancoor
 Stardust  -  Andre

Mansfield Playhouse,  Mansfield, Ohio
 A Comedy of Errors -  Antipholus of Syracuse
 Romeo and Juliet -  Romeo
 Zoo Story -  Jerry

Mansfield Summer Theater,  Mansfield, Ohio
 1776 -  Thomas Jefferson

Maryland Shakespeare Festival,  Frederick, Maryland
 HMS Pinafore -  Ralph Rackstraw
 Taming of the Shrew -  Vincentio

Maryland Shakespeare Festival, St. Mary's, Maryland
 Living History -  Dan Clocker

Community Players,  McLean, Virginia
 Blame It On the Movies -  Man One
 I Do! I Do!
 Michael Snow
 Seven Brides for Seven Brothers  Adam Pontipee
 The Sound of Music -  Captain von Trapp

National Theatre,  Washington, D.C.
 Bobby Jean -  Doug Simpson
 Cycles -  Zachary Moon

Ohio Northern University,  Ada, Ohio
 Hello World! -  Max
 H.M.S. Pinafore -  Captain Corcharan
 The Creation of the World and Other Business -  Adam
 The Good Woman of Setzuan -  Yang Sun

Ohio State University,  Columbus, Ohio
 The Boys from Syracuse -  Antipholus of Syracuse
 The Summer Tree -  Matt
 Twice Told Tales - Young Goodman Brown

Puccunello's Dinner Theater,  Mansfield, Ohio
 The Owl and the Pussycat -  Felix Sherman

Rockville Little Theatre,  Rockville, Maryland
 Light Up the Sky -  Sven Svenson

Rockville Musical Theatre, Rockville, Maryland
 20th Silver Anniversary Review -  Himself
 Camelot - Lancelot du Lac
 Chess - Anatoly Sergievsky
 Guys and Dolls - Sky Masterson
 Hello, Dolly! - Mr Rose
 Mame - Beauregard Jackson Pickett Burnside
 Oklahoma!-  Curly McClain
 On the 20th Century -  Oscar Jaffe

Sandy Springs CommTheatre,  Gaithersburg, Maryland
 Cabaret - Cliff Bradshaw

Second Star Productions,  Bowie, Maryland
 I Do! I Do! - Michael Snow

Signature Theatre,  Arlington, Virginia
 Strings of My Heart -  Chuck

Silver Spring Stage, Silver Spring, Maryland
 Company -  Bobby

Source Theatre,  Washington, D.C.
 Bent - Wolf
 Echoes -  Halderman
 Equus - Dalton\Horseman\Nugget
 Father's Day -  Harold

St Marks Players,  Washington, D.C.
 Oliver! - Bill Sykes

Tantallon Community Players, Fort Washington, Maryland
 Funny Girl -  Nick Anrstein
 I Do! I Do! -  Michael Snow
 Into the Woods -  Cinderella's Prince/Wolf
 Oliver! -  Bill Sykes
 The Scarlet Pimpernel -  Sir Percy Blakeney
 The Sound of Music -  Captain von Trapp

The Arlington Players,  Arlington, Virginia
 Carnival! -  Marco the Magnificent
 Love Letters -  Andrew Makepeace Ladd III
 On the Town - Judge Pritkin
 Seven Brides for Seven Brothers - Adam Pontipee
 Sweeney Todd - Judge Turpin

The Tavern Stage
 The Way to the Top - Teddy Thoreau

Trinity Theatre, Washington, D.C.
 Guys and Dolls -  Sky Masterson

West End Dinner Theatre,  Alexandria, Virginia
 Grease - Vince Fontaine/Teen Angel
 Seven Brides for Seven Brothers -  Adam Pontipee
 South Pacific -  Emile De Becque
 The Sound of Music -  Captain von Trapp

Director 

American Music Stage, Burke, Virginia
 42nd Street
 Aida

Atlas Theater,  Washington, D.C.
 The Wiz

Backstreet Theater,  Ada, Ohio
 Hello World!
 My Fair Lady
 The Robber Bridegroom

C.A.S.T. in McLean, McLean, Virginia
 Dial 'M' for Murder
 Gypsy
 Some Enchanted Evening
 South Pacific
 Dominion Stage, Arlington, Virginia
 They're Playing Our Song

Encore Theater, Lima, Ohio
 Mame
 The Music Man
Foundry Players,  Washington, D.C.
 Closer Than Ever

Lazy Susan Dinner Theater, Woodbridge, Virginia
A Christmas Carol
Appointment with Death
Beehive
Black Coffee
Clue the Musical
Death on the Nile
Do Black Patent Leather Shoes Really Reflect Up?
I Do! I Do!
Me and My Girl
Nunsense
Seven Brides for Seven Brothers
Something's Afoot
Steel Magnolias
Ten Little Indians
The Hollow
The Mousetrap
The Murder at the Vicarage
The Pajama Game
The Spitfire Grill
Witness for the Prosecution

Little Theater Of Alexandria, Alexandria, Virginia
 Something's Afoot

McLean Community Players, McLean, Virginia
 La Cage aux Folles
Little Shop of Horrors

McLean Theater Alliance, McLean, Virginia
Best Of Broadway I and II-Cabarets
Seven Brides for Seven Brothers

Potomac Theater Company, Potomac, Maryland
 Something's Afoot

Rock Spring Congregational Church, McLean, Virginia
Jesus Christ Superstar

Rockville Musical Theatre, Rockville, Maryland
 42nd Street
City of Angels
Evita
Meet Me In St. Louis
Gypsy
Hello, Dolly!
My Fair Lady
On the 20th Century
RMT Silver Jubilee

Tantallon Community Players, Fort Washington, Maryland
Guys and Dolls
Our Town
The Scarlet Pimpernel

The Writer's Center, Washington, D.C.
 The Most Romantic Hair In the World

References 

1954 births
Living people
Male actors from Cleveland
American male musical theatre actors
American male film actors
20th-century American male actors
21st-century American male actors
American musical theatre directors
People from Galion, Ohio